Ukrina is a river in the Central Bosnia, Bosnia and Herzegovina, right tributary of the river Sava. Its mouth is  3 km north from settlement Koraće and 10 km southwest of Brod.

Ukrina is produced by the merging of the Mala Ukrina (Small Ukrina) and Velika Ukrina (Great Ukrina). The length of Ukrina of origin Great Ukrina (Lukavac) is 119.3 km, and the surface area of the basin is 1504 km².

See also
Derventa
Bosanski Brod

References

Rivers of Bosnia and Herzegovina